Caj Malmberg (born 24 January 1948) is a Finnish wrestler. He competed in the men's Greco-Roman 97 kg at the 1968 Summer Olympics.

References

External links
 

1948 births
Living people
Finnish male sport wrestlers
Olympic wrestlers of Finland
Wrestlers at the 1968 Summer Olympics
Sportspeople from Helsinki